Miguel Labordeta Subías (16 July 1921 - 1 August 1969) was an Aragonese poet. He was born in Zaragoza, Aragón, Spain. He held a Doctorate in History from the University of Madrid. His younger brother was the singer, writer and politician José Antonio Labordeta.

Poetry 
(1948): Sumido 25
(1949): Violento Idílico. Madrid, Clan Booksellers ("Cuadernos de Poesía", nº 8), published by Tomás Seral y Casas.
(1950): Transeúnte central
(1960): Memorándum. Poética Autología'''. Zaragoza, ("Orejudín", nº 5).
(1961): Epilírica, Bilbao, Alrededor de la Mesa (Comunicación Poética).
(1967): Punto y aparte, Madrid, Ciencia Nueva ("El Bardo", nº 34).
(1969): Los soliloquios, Zaragoza, Javalambre ("Fuendetodos", nº 1).
(1972a): Obras Completas (Complete Works), with a prologue by José Antonio Labordeta, Javalambre ("Fuendetodos", nº 11).
(1972b): Autopía, with a prologue by Rosendo Tello, Barcelona (El Bardo).
(1975): La escasa merienda de los tigres y otros poemas, ed. de Pedro Vergés, Barcelona, Barral ("Ocnos", nº 50).
(1981): Epilírica (Los nueve en punto), Barcelona, Lumen. 
(1983a): Metalírica, Madrid, Hiperión.
(1983b): Obra completa (Complete Works), 3 books, Barcelona, El Bardo  Collection.
Luis, Leopoldo de, ed. (1969): Antología de la poesía social, Madrid, Taurus.

 Theatre 
(1955): Oficina de horizonte''

1921 births
1969 deaths
Aragonese writers